Aryan Tsiutryn (born 23 November 1994) is a Russian and Belarusian freestyle wrestler. He won one of the bronze medals in the men's 57 kg event at the 2021 World Wrestling Championships held in Oslo, Norway.

References

External links 
 

Living people
Place of birth missing (living people)
Belarusian male sport wrestlers
World Wrestling Championships medalists
1994 births